Ricardo Luis Armentano Feijoo (born 3 August 1957) is an Uruguayan professor and researcher who has worked in biomedical engineering and cardiovascular systems. He currently serves as the director of the GIBIO research group at the National Technological University — Buenos Aires Regional Faculty (Argentina). Also he is the director of the Department of Biological Engineering, University of the Republic (Uruguay). He has two doctoral degrees, two post-doctoral degrees, and has authored more than 300 research articles and 20 books/book chapters.

Prof. Ricardo Armentano has done thorough and remarkable work in the field of Engineering in Biology and Medicine from its theoretical fundamentals to its application in clinical practice, throughout a conscious-technology approach with humanistic motivation and global vision. The originality of his approaches has led him to achieve two PhD degrees: the first one in Physiological Sciences from the University of Buenos Aires, and the second one in Biomechanics from the University of Paris Denis Diderot VII with the highest qualifications. Given that poverty, malnutrition and environmental degradation may increase the propensity to cardiovascular diseases, Professor Armentano focused his works to model cardiovascular dynamics in these high-risk groups. He has dedicated a considerable amount of time throughout his career to set up and train a research group, aware of the importance of an adequate working environment over final results. He created a team consisting of young students, engineers, medical doctors, physicists, mathematicians and other specialists and centered his attention on human resources to spread out his latest advances and potentially increase the whole research line motivation. Professor Armentano has created and directed the seasonal school ¨Modeling in Biomechanics and Mechanobiology¨ for graduate students, early stage researchers and practitioners with organized opportunities to build communities with professors from many countries and established practitioners and engage in hands-on tutorials in Biomechanics and Mechanobiology at the School of Engineering of Buenos Aires University.

Education 

 Electronics Engineering Degree: National Technological University (1984)
 PhD: University of Buenos Aires (1994)
 PhD: University of Paris Denis Diderot VII (1999)
 Post-Doc: University of Paris Descartes (2008) and University of the Republic (Uruguay) (2002)

Academic career 

Dr. Ricardo Armentano received his Electronic Engineer degree in 1984. Two years before graduation, he won the competition for a pregraduate fellowship at the Department of Biomedical Engineering of the Favaloro Foundation, to develop equipment for biomedical research. There he received intensive training in Biomedical Instrumentation and modeling of biological systems at the school of Engineering of the University of Buenos Aires. In 1984 he became  an Independent Investigator at the Research and Teaching Department of the Favaloro Foundation, and in 1986 he obtained a research fellowship granted by the INSERM (France) – CONICET (Argentina) Cooperation Agreement to investigate in Arterial Mechanics at l’Unité 28 de l’Institut de la Santé et la Recherche Medicale, in the Centre de Médicine Préventive Cardiovasculaire, Hôpital Broussais, Paris, France, under the direction of Dr. Jaime Levenson.

In 1988 he was granted a 4-month INSERM scholarship as Invited Investigator at Unité 263, INSERM, of the Unité de Recherches Biomathématiques et Bioestatistiques de l’Université Paris VII, under the direction of Professor Nguyen Phong Chau, where he specialized in Biomathematics and Biostatistics. Between 1990 and 1993, supported by the INSERM – CONICET Cooperation Agreement, he traveled regularly to Paris, where he developed the Constitutive Equation of the Arterial Wall, which allows to follow-up the alterations of the diverse structural components of the arterial wall during the course of different arterial diseases. This model was successfully validated in animals and then widely applied in humans.

In 1992 he was the invited speaker at the Official Course of Specialization in Cardiology at both the University of Buenos Aires  and the Universidad del Salvador in Buenos Aires. In the Federative Republic of Brazil, he was invited speaker of a doctoral course in Cardiovascular Dynamics in Biomedical Engineering at the University Hospital of the Federal University of Santa Catarina. During the same year, he was invited speaker and he acted as Member of Doctoral Thesis Examination Board at the Ëcole Centrale de Arts et Metiers de Paris by Prof Jean E Morell. In the same year he was appointed Professor at the University Institute of Biomedical Sciences of the Favaloro Foundation.

In 1993 he participated as Invited Researcher at the INSIBIO (Superior Institute of Biomedical Engineering) under the direction of Dr. Eng. Máximo E. Valentinuzzi of the National University of Tucumán, Argentina. During the same year, he returned, transitorily, to his native country (no se sabe cuál es) as a member of the PEDECIBA (United Nations Program for the Development of Basic Sciences), within the project URU/84/002 of the Ministry of Education and Culture and the Universidad de la República. As a member of the PEDECIBA he was assigned the maximum category: Grade 5 Investigator.

In 1994 he was appointed Principal Investigator of the Basic Science Research Institute of the Favaloro Foundation, and since then he is the leader of the Arterial System Dynamics Project, to which he has dedicated most of his efforts. By the end of 1994 he qualified as Doctor of the University of Buenos Aires in Physiological Sciences, under the direction of Dr. Mario Parisi, with the highest qualification (excellent), and started his studies to develop a doctoral thesis in Physics at the Université Denis Diderot. He was granted a fellowship at the Centre International des Etudiants et Stagiaires to carry out research in the Laboratoire de Biorhelogie et Hydrodynamique Physicoquimique, CNRS, URA 343, under the direction of Dr. Patrice Flaud. To continue his investigations, he received grants from Université Pierre et Marie Curie, Paris VI, and later (1997) from Fondation Biologia et Naturalia of Paris. In 1998 he won the competition for a Professorship position in Fluids Mechanics in Bioingineering at the School of Engineering of Buenos Aires University, and was appointed Director of the Department of Electronics at the Favaloro University. In this University, he was a member of the Superior Council and President of the Council of Research and Development.

In 1999 he obtained the Degree of Docteur de l’Université de Paris VII Denis Diderot, for the Doctorat de Biomecanique: Mecanique de Systèmes Biologiques, under the direction of Dr. Patrice Flaud, with the highest qualification: Très Honorable avec Felicitations du Jury.

He was a fellow of the Clemente Stable Fund (CONICYT) for a postdoctoral position at the school of Medicine, University of the Republic. Area of knowledge: Quantitative Physiology, Cardiovascular Hemodynamics (2002-2003)

In 2003 he was appointed Dean of the School of Engineering and Exact and Natural Sciences of Favaloro University.

In December 2004 he was selected as researcher class 1 by the Ministry of Education, Culture and Technology of the República Argentina. In October 2005 he was designated Director of the PhD program on signal processing of the National Technological University of Buenos Aires.  In 2008 he has been honored with a senior fellowship of the Ville de Paris for French post doctoral researchers in Paris city laboratories supervised by Prof. Alain Simon. Professor Armentano is a visiting professor at Institut Jean le Rond d'Alembert Université Pierre et Marie Curie, Paris France and at the Politechnic University, Madrid Spain. He has been elected Co-Chair Global of the Citizen Safety and Security working group of the International Federation for Medical and Biological Engineering (IFMBE).

Dr. Ricardo Armentano has participated in more than 100 international scientific congresses with a total of 300 published abstracts, has given more than 130 conferences, has published more than 200 scientific papers in peer-reviewed international journals and more than 30 book chapters. He has directed 30 doctoral and master theses.

IEEE Society career 

Ricardo Armentano is a member of the Engineering in Medicine and Biology Society of the Institute of Electrical and Electronics Engineers (IEEE) since 1985. In 2001 he was elected as a Senior Member of the IEEE and In December 2004 he was appointed chair of the Argentinean Chapter of the EMBS, IEEE. He was the conference chair of the 32nd International Conference EMBS/IEEE Buenos Aires 2010. He was a member of the International Program Committee in the 31st Annual International Conference of IEEE Engineering in Medicine and Biology Society, member of the International Program Committee for the 34 IEEE Engineering in Medicine and Biology Conference (EMBC’12) and member of the Conference Organization Advisory Board of the 33rd IEEE Engineering in Medicine and Biology Conference. He served at IEEE Corporate - Awards as a member in the 2015 IEEE Healthcare Technology Medal Committee and in 2015 IEEE Biomedical Engineering Award Committee. He was served as the AdCom 2015 EMBS IEEE Latin America Officer.

He has been President of the Argentine Society of Bioengineering and Argentine delegate in the Latin American Regional Council on Biomedical Engineering (CORAL), an organization co-sponsored by IEEE/EMBS and IFMBE. He chaired the XII Argentine Congress of Bioengineering SABI/EMBS Chapter in Buenos Aires city. He is a member of the IEEE Society on Social Implications of Technology since 2010.

Also Dr. Armentano is the Vice President of the Argentine Chapter of IEEE Society of Social Implications of Technology (SSIT) (2017). He is a member of EMBS IEEE Technical Committee on Cardiopulmonary Systems (2017). Currently he is a distinguished lecturer of the IEEE-EMBS.

Awards and honours 

 1988 he received the Rosalía Feldblit de Garfunkel Award of the National Academy of Medicine for his work: Mechanical Assistance of Severe Heart Failure.
 1994 he was again awarded with the Rosalía Feldblit de Garfunkel Award of the National Academy of Medicine for his work: Border-line Hypertension: a Pre-hypertensive State?.
 1997, during the Argentine Congress of Arterial Hypertension, he obtained the Luis Moledo Award of the Argentine Society of Cardiology, for his contributions in the diagnosis of hypertension.
 1999 he was awarded the Special Mention of the New Engineerings Award to the best work in biomedical engineering, entitled The Engineering of the Circulation and its Application to Arterial System Dynamics and Non-invasive Evaluation of Artheriopaties, granted by the Argentine Center of Engineers and the Agency for Scientific and Technological Promotion.
 2000 he obtained the Juan Antonio González Award to the best study referred to the cardiovascular system, granted by the National Academy of Medicine, for the work entitled: Experimental and Clinical Aortic Counterpulsation: its Evaluation with a Novel Non-invasive Index
 2001 he was awarded the Luis Moledo Award to the best work in Arterial Hypertension granted by the Argentine Council of Hypertension.
 October 2002 he obtained the Mapfre Awards of the National Congress of the Spanish Society of Cardiology to the best Iberoamerican study with the work “Comparative study of the systemic and pulmonary ventricular arterial coupling”.
 October 2005 he obtained for the second time the Mapfre Awards of the National Congress of the Spanish Society of Cardiology to the best Iberoamerican study with the work “Fresh and Cryopreserved Arterial Allografts present higher functional similitude with the native artery, than the grafts commonly used”.
 October 2005 he was again awarded the Luis Moledo Award to the best work in Arterial Hypertension entitled "Anormal dissipation of the Carotid Wall Energetics in Human Hypertension and the restoring by means of the Angiotensin-Converting Enzyme Inhibition" granted by the Argentine Council of Hypertension.
 October 2006 he obtained for the third time the Mapfre Awards of the National Congress of the Spanish Society of Cardiology with the best Iberoamerican study with the work “Enhancement of the arterial adventitia, the adventitia regulates the function of arterial conduit function and damping mechanism for a muscle-dependent activation”.
 October 2007 he obtained the Best Scientific Work Award of the Iberoamerican Congress of Cardiovascular Diseases, 43rd Congress of the Spanish Society of Cardiology. Award-winning work: The professional footballers achieve greater efficiency by minimizing the energy ventricular torsional evaluated through echography speckle-tracking.
 October 2008 he obtained the Best Scientific Work Award of the Iberoamerican Congress of Cardiovascular Diseases, 44th Congress of the Spanish Society of Cardiology. Award-winning work Studio pre and post-implant biomechanical function of cryopreserved arteries and their coupling to the receptor vascular system: diagnostic innovation and in November of the same year he has been honored the engineer Juan  Sabato prize for his career in scientific research awarded by the Higher Council of the National Technological University. 
 June 2011 he was recognized as Qualified Collaborator. Associate Professor. Hospital de Clinicas. Montevideo. Uruguay
 November 2011 he was recognized as Vice Chair of the International Federation of Medical and Biological Engineering (IFMBE) Global Citizen Safety and Security Working Group (WG). 2011–2015.
 November 2012 he received the"Public Interest" Nova Award for CUIIDARTE project. National Agency for Research and Innovation in partnership with the Chamber of Industries of Uruguay, the National Chamber of Commerce and Services of Uruguay, the Uruguayan Chamber of Information Technologies, Federated Agricultural Cooperatives, Endeavor, UNDP ART Programme, Red Propymes, Union Exporters of Uruguay and Uruguay XXI
 July 2015 he was re-elected as Vice Chair of the International Federation of Medical and Biological Engineering (IFMBE) Global Citizen Safety and Security Working Group (WG). 2015-cont.
 May 2017 he was honored to participate in the Advisory Committee of the Argentine Chapter of ARTERY Association for Research into Arterial Structure and Physiology. 
 December 2017 he was recognized as honorary member of the Endothelium Unit. Ramon y Cajal Hospital. Madrid. Spain

PhD supervision and examination (from 2000 onwards) 

 Ariel Guarnieri (Examination). Ph.D Thesis. School of Engineering. National University of Litoral. INTEC Santa Fe. Argentina. 2000
 Jorge Monzón (Examination). Ph.D Thesis. University of North East. 2004. Argentina
 Teresita Cuadrado (Examination). Ph.D Thesis.  University of Mar del Plata. 2006. Argentina
 Eduardo Migliaro (Examination). Ph.D Thesis. School of Medicine. University of the Republic. 2007. Uruguay
 Cintia Galli (Examination). Ph.D Thesis. School of Medicine. University of Buenos Aires. 2011. Argentina
 María Inés PISARELLO (Examination). Ph.D Thesis. University of North East. 2012. Argentina
 Javier Brum. Rapporteur THÈSE pour obtenir le grade de DOCTEUR DE L’UNIVERSITÉ DE GRENOBLE. Membre du Jury. Elastographie et retournement temporel des ondes de cisaillement: application a l'imagerie de solides mous. Spécialité : Physique Appliqué. 2012
 Marcelo R. Risk. (Supervision) Ph.D Thesis. "Spectral analysis of the blood pressure signal, heart rate and baroreflex control". School of Medicine. University of Buenos Aires. 2000. Argentina
 Lucas G. Gamero. (Supervision) Ph.D Thesis "Modeling, Characterization and Identification of the Arterial System with Noninvasive Diagnostic Techniques" School of Engineering. University of Buenos Aires. 2002. Argentina
 Damian Craiem. (Supervision) Ph.D Thesis. "Cardiovascular Engineering: Fractional Calculus and arterial viscoelasticity"  School of Engineering. University of Buenos Aires. 2007. Argentina 
 Daniel Bia Santana. (Supervision) Ph.D Thesis. "Functional analysis of human cryopreserved vascular homografts by in vitro and in vivo studies". PEDECIBA. School of Medicine. University of the Republic. 2008. Uruguay
 Sebastián Graf. (Supervision) Ph.D Thesis. "Noninvasive detection of arterial alterations induced by atherosclerosis and hypertension". School of Medicine. University of Buenos Aires. 2008. Argentina
 Yanina Zócalo. (Supervision) Ph.D Thesis. "Biomechanics functional characterization of ovine and human vein wall in physiological conditions and vascular substitute: a comparative study with the arterial wall and synthetic vascular prostheses"  PROINBIO. School of Medicine. University of the Republic. 2009. Uruguay.
 Franco Pessana. (Supervision) Ph.D Thesis. "Cardiovascular Engineering: Effects of Wall-Flow Interaction on the Mechanical Properties of Arteries" 2013. Argentina
 LINDESAY, George.  (Examination) PhD Thesis. Effect of sympathetic nerve activity on the stiffness of conduit arteries. Supervisor: Alberto Avolio. Macquarie University. Australia. 2014
 Federico Biafore (Examination). Ph.D. Thesis. "Study on Mathematical Modeling and Control of Infection by the Human Immunodeficiency Virus (HIV)" 2015. Argentina
 Guillermo Bergues (Examination). Ph.D. Thesis. "Detection of lines and surfaces crested. Digital images processing as part of a vision system for Nikon 6B autocollimator / 6D" 2015. Argentina
 Diego Suarez. "Contributions to the study of arterial wall-fluid interaction in arteries and its relationship with the biomechanical properties of the vessel in normal and pathological conditions". PEDECIBA. ANII. 2017. University of the Republic. Uruguay
 Jorge Pérez Zerpa. "Development of a computational tool for solving inverse problems associated with the diagnosis of Atherosclerosis" 2011. PEDECIBA ANII. University of the Republic. Uruguay. 2017
 José Arévalo Alquichire. (Examination) PhD Thesis. "Polyurethanes for vascular applications: Effect of polyol blend composition and surface modification on mechanical properties, viscoelasticity, in vitro endothelialization and hemocompatibility". Universidad de La Sabana . Colombia

Current students – PhD candidates 

 Mariano Casciaro. "Dimensional geometric analysis of cardiovascular network in humans". School of Engineering. 2013. University of Buenos Aires. Argentina.           
 Guillermo Balay "Theoretical and experimental study of cardiovascular dynamics" 2013. PEDECIBA. University of the Republic. Uruguay
 Cesar M. Bucci "Modeling Using Cluster Analysis on Clinical Cardiovascular Risk Variables" National Technological University. Argentina.
 Victor Bourel  "Biomarkers validation of radiobiological models" 2015. Favaloro University. Argentina
 Parag Chatterjee "Internet of Things Applied to Cardiometabolic Diseases" 2016. National Technological University. Argentina
 Luis Romero (Supervision)  PhD thesis. "Detection and quantification of characteristic signs in patients with movement disorders using portable, interconnected sensors". Favaloro University. Argentina
 Alejandro Rodrigo. (Supervision) PhD thesis. "Modeling of upper limb and trunk dynamics through motion-oriented technologies to objectify kinesthetic evolution in post-stroke patients". Favaloro University. Argentina
 German Fierro (Supervision)  "Implementation of a wearable system able to monitor blood pressure in a non-occlusive, non-invasive way, through the transit time of pulse". Ph. D. Electrical Engineering, University of the Republic. Uruguay.
 Manuel Alfonso (Supervision). "Computational study of solitonic waves propagation of in transmission lines". National Technological University. Buenos Aires. Argentina

References 

1957 births
Living people
National Technological University alumni
University of Buenos Aires alumni
Paris Diderot University alumni
Academic staff of the University of the Republic (Uruguay)
Biomedical engineers
Uruguayan bioengineers